Syrnola manilensis is a species of sea snail, a marine gastropod mollusk in the family Pyramidellidae, the pyrams and their allies.

Distribution
This marine species occurs off the Philippines.

References

External links
 To World Register of Marine Species
 Museum of Comparative Zoology - Harvard University: Syrnola manilensis

Pyramidellidae
Gastropods described in 1896